Anton Ørskov Ipsen (born 4 September 1994) is a Danish swimmer. He competed in the men's 400 metre and men's 1500 metre events at the 2016 Summer Olympics. Ipsen finished 20th and 18th respectively at those events.

Ispen competes for North Carolina State University as a swimmer and is majoring in industrial engineering. He was named Danish swimmer of the year in 2016 and NC State's Scholar-Athlete of the Year in 2017. He competed in three events at the 2019 World Aquatics Championships held in Gwangju, South Korea.

References

External links
 

1994 births
Living people
Swimmers from Berlin
Olympic swimmers of Denmark
Swimmers at the 2016 Summer Olympics
People from Rudersdal Municipality
Danish male freestyle swimmers
Swimmers at the 2020 Summer Olympics
NC State Wolfpack men's swimmers
Sportspeople from the Capital Region of Denmark